Hans Peter Aglassinger (born 1963 in Salzburg, Austria) is an Austrian industrial designer that is known for being one of the principles of TEAMS Design GmbH in Esslingen, Germany.  He is best known for his award-winning work for Robert Bosch GmbH.  Hans Peter has been instrumental in keeping many long term relationships alive with companies such as Robert Bosch, Still, Silit and Leifheit.

History
Aglassinger studied industrial design at the University of Arts and Industrial Design Linz in Austria.  He designed for TEAMS Design GmbH in Esslingen, working directly with Hans Erich Slany before becoming a partner in 2002.  He continues to actively contribute to the design culture at TEAMS.  Aglassinger has also taught and lectured at neighboring universities such as University of Graz in Austria and University of Wuppertal in Germany.  He has also been interviewed on various international sites.

Recent Design Awards
2002
iF Product Design Award
 Robert Bosch GmbH GBH 540 Hammer Drill and the AH40-24 Hedge Trimmer
2003
iF Product Design Award
 Robert Bosch GmbH D-Tect 100 Universal Positioning Device and the GWS 14.4V Cordless Angle Grinder
Red Dot Design Award
 Robert Bosch GmbH GOF 2000 CE Professional Router
2004
iF Product Design Award
 Robert Bosch GmbH GEX 150 Turbo Professional Orbital Sander, GSB 20-2 RE Hammer Drill, and the IXO Cordless Compact Screwdriver, CS20 Circular Saw
2006
iF Product Design Awards
 Schüco Window Design Handle Line
2007
Red Dot Design Award
 Robert Bosch GmbH GWS 15-125 CITH Professional Angle Grinder, GSH 16-30 Professional Demolition Hammer, DLE 50 Professional Laser Rangefinder, and the GDR 10.8 V-LI Professional Cordless Impact Driver
iF Package Design Award
 Robert Bosch GmbH Mini X-Line Power Tool Cassettes (update) and the X-Line Range of Power Tool Cases (update)
Deutscher Verpackungs Preis
 Robert Bosch GmbH X-Line Range of Power Tool Cases
ISH Design Plus Award
 Schüco Absorption Refrigerator
2008
Red Dot Design Honorable Mention
Swiss Star Package Design Award
 Robert Bosch GmbH Robust Line
iF Packaging Design Award
 Robert Bosch GmbH X-Line Range Power Tool Accessory Cases and the Mini X-Line Power Tool Accessory Cassettes
2009
Red Dot Awards
Robert Bosch GTM 12 Combination Saw, GWS 22-180 LVI / 24-180 LVI Angle Grinder and the Uneo 3-in-1 Power Tool
2010
iF Award
Robert Bosch AHS 54-20 LI Cordless Hedgecutter and ASB 10.8 LI Cordless Shrub and Grass Shear Set

References

Patents
 Misc. Patents 1
 Misc. Patents 2
 Patents 3
 Misc. Patents 4
 Misc. Patents 5

External links
 TEAMS Design
 Designer Profile Online (in German)

1963 births
Living people
Austrian industrial designers